Aveiro District (or ) is located in the central coastal region of Portugal. The capital of the district is the city of Aveiro, which also serves as the seat of Aveiro Municipality.

Aveiro District is bordered by the Porto District to the north, the Viseu District to the east, the Coimbra District to the south, and the Atlantic Ocean to the west.

The 19 municipalities of Aveiro District are split between Norte Region (Metropolitan Area of Porto and Espinho subregion: Grande Porto) and Centro Region (Baixo Vouga subregion).

Municipalities
The district is composed of 19 municipalities:

All 19 municipalities is divided into 147 freguesias or parishes.

Summary of votes and seats won 1976-2022

|- class="unsortable"
!rowspan=2|Parties!!%!!S!!%!!S!!%!!S!!%!!S!!%!!S!!%!!S!!%!!S!!%!!S!!%!!S!!%!!S!!%!!S!!%!!S!!%!!S!!%!!S!!%!!S!!%!!S
|- class="unsortable" align="center"
!colspan=2 | 1976
!colspan=2 | 1979
!colspan=2 | 1980
!colspan=2 | 1983
!colspan=2 | 1985
!colspan=2 | 1987
!colspan=2 | 1991
!colspan=2 | 1995
!colspan=2 | 1999
!colspan=2 | 2002
!colspan=2 | 2005
!colspan=2 | 2009
!colspan=2 | 2011
!colspan=2 | 2015
!colspan=2 | 2019
!colspan=2 | 2022
|-
| align="left"| PS || 30.8 || 5 || 28.4 || 5 || 27.1 || 4 || style="background:#FF66FF;|36.6 || style="background:#FF66FF;|6 || 23.0 || 4 || 22.9 || 4 || 27.8 || 4 || 40.2 || 6 || style="background:#FF66FF;|40.2 || style="background:#FF66FF;|7 || 33.5 || 5 || style="background:#FF66FF;|41.1 || style="background:#FF66FF;|8 || 33.8 || 6 || 25.9 || 5 || 27.9 || 5 || style="background:#FF66FF;|34.3 || style="background:#FF66FF;|7 || style="background:#FF66FF;|39.5 || style="background:#FF66FF;|8
|-
| align="left"| PSD || style="background:#FF9900;"|35.2 || style="background:#FF9900;"|6 || align=center colspan=4 rowspan=2|In AD || 34.8 || 6 || style="background:#FF9900;"|38.4 || style="background:#FF9900;"|6 || style="background:#FF9900;"|60.2 || style="background:#FF9900;"|11 || style="background:#FF9900;"|58.6 || style="background:#FF9900;"|9 || style="background:#FF9900;"|41.2 || style="background:#FF9900;"|6 || 38.3 || 6 || style="background:#FF9900;"|46.4 || style="background:#FF9900;"|8 || 35.7 || 6 || style="background:#FF9900;"|34.6 || style="background:#FF9900;"|7 || style="background:#FF9900;"|44.5 || style="background:#FF9900;"|8 || align=center colspan=2 rowspan=2|In PàF || 33.6 || 6
 || 35.7 || 7
|-
| align="left"| CDS-PP || 22.5 || 4 || 16.4 || 2 || 13.5 || 2 || 5.3 ||  || 6.1 || 1 || 12.6 || 2 || 13.6 || 2 || 12.9 || 2 || 9.8 || 1 || 13.0 || 2 || 12.9 || 2 || 5.7 || 1 || 2.5 || 
|-
| align="left"| PCP/APU/CDU || 3.7 ||  || 7.9 || 1 || 6.8 || 1 || 7.0 || 1 || 6.5 || 1 || 4.2 ||  || 2.8 ||  || 2.7 ||  || 3.5 ||  || 2.6 ||  || 3.5 ||  || 3.8 ||  || 4.1 ||  || 4.4 ||  || 3.1 ||  || 1.8 || 
|-
| align="left"| AD || colspan=2| || style="background:#00FFFF;"|56.7 || style="background:#00FFFF;"|9 || style="background:#00FFFF;"|58.8 || style="background:#00FFFF;"|10 || colspan=26|
|-
| align="left"| PRD || colspan=8| || 13.3 || 2 || 2.7 ||  || 0.3 ||  || colspan=18|
|-
| align="left"| BE || colspan=16| || 1.3 ||  || 1.8 ||  || 5.1 ||  || 9.0 || 1 || 5.0 || 1 || 9.6 || 1 || 10.0 || 2 || 4.6 
|-
| align="left"| PàF || colspan=26| || style="background:#00AAAA;"|48.1 || style="background:#00AAAA;"|10 || colspan=4| 
|-
| align="left"| CHEGA || colspan=28| || 0.7 ||  || 5.6 || 1
|-
! Total seats || colspan=12|15 || colspan=4|14 || colspan=6|15 || colspan=10|16
|-
! colspan=33| Source: Comissão Nacional de Eleições
|}

External links
Photos from Aveiro (district)

 
Districts of Portugal